Milejovice is a municipality and village in Strakonice District in the South Bohemian Region of the Czech Republic. It has about 70 inhabitants.

Geography
It lies in the Bohemian Forest Foothills.

History

The first written mention of Milejovice is from 1315.

Sights
In the centre of Milejovice is a chapel.

In the eastern part of the municipal territory is Dobrá voda, a pilgrimage site with the Chapel of the Most Blessed Virgin Mary, Stations of the Cross. The chapel was built in 1889–1891 next to a well with a supposedly healing spring.

References

External links

Villages in Strakonice District